Melapalayam is a neighborhood of Tirunelveli City in Tamil Nadu, India situated on the east bank of the Thamirabarani River. The neighborhood's name comes from its location west of Palayamkottai. Eighty percent of the population is Muslim.

History
Melapalayam was known as Keela Veera Ragavapuram during British Rule. The old Tamil name for the region is Mangai Maa Nagar.

Literacy
Melapalayam has an average literacy rate of 62.4%, higher than the national average of 59.5%. Male literacy is 71.6% while female literacy is 28.4%.

Education
The area of Melapalayam had a poor standard of education until the 21st century. Since then, more schools have been established and educational accessibility has increased. Many welfare trusts have been formed advocating for social awareness of education. The Muslim Higher Secondary School in Melapalayam attained Tamil Nadu state second level rank in the SSLC examination held in April 2011. As a result of campaigning by social organizations, there was a visible increase in literacy; candidates from Melapalayam have acquired seats in IIT, IISc and other prominent universities both in India and abroad.

List of Schools
Higher secondary schools in the neighborhood are classified as Government Aided Minority Institutions. Part of the student community of Melapalayam travels to Palayamkottai for education.

Matriculation Schools

 Golden Jubliee Matric HSS
 Zareena Fathima Matriculation School

Higher secondary schools

 The Muslim Higher Secondary School
 TIME Matriculation school (with more than 95% students from Melapalayam, placed near Melapalayam)
 The Muslim Girls Higher Secondary School
 Rahmania Higher Secondary School
 Quaide Millath Higher Secondary School
 Don Bosco Matriculation Higher Secondary School

CBSE schools 
 Al Madina Cbse School
 Mutthamil Public School

NURSERY & PRIMARY SCHOOLS

 Little star N&p
 Al irshad N&P
 Al huda N&P
 Al biyan N&P
 Siraj oriental N&P
 MAS N&P
 MAR N&P
 MKS N&P
 Jawahar N&P
 South Mohideen N&P
 New red rose N&P
 Nehru N&P
 Rose N&P

=GOVERNMENT N&P SCHOOLS

 Ganesapuram west school
 Ganesapuram east school
 Azath school
 Hameem middle school
 VST corporation school
 Ganesamoorthy school
 Gazanathul school

List of colleges

Annai Hajira Women's College
Government Engineering College, Tirunelveli

List of Arabic colleges

Men's colleges
Jaamiathul Aliya Fe MaAaliyas Saniyaa Arabic College
Thaarul Ulum Usmaaniya Arabic College
Islamic College

Women's colleges
Al Irshaad
Tharbiyathunisha
Hidayathadunhislan
Shirin Farhana
Nashisathun Linisvaan
Thaglimun Nisvaan
Magdinul Ulum
Al-Muneera Women's Arabic College

Women's madrasas
Rifayee Moulana Vellai Kalifa Womens College
Al Irshad Islamic College for Girls
Jamshul Buhariya
Faizhur Rahman Arabic Madharsha & Womens College
Al madrasathul Riffayia
Tharihatul Ilashiya
Naasirul Millat Girls Madarasa - Asura East Street
Al Madrasathul Majithilla
Al Baakiyathus salihath
Nasheehathul Islam
Noorul Islam Women Islamic College
Irfanul Huda Trust for Education & Charity

Mosques
There are more than 100 mosques in the neighborhood, many containing cemeteries. Major mosques are located at the ends of streets. The majority of mosques are 'Waqf' registered and are administrated by local residents, usually residents of the particular Mohalla.

Culture
Islam and Hindu celebrations and ceremonies are common in the neighborhood.

Business
In the neighborhood's early years, its economy was based on handloom trading. Handloom products were exported to various countries such as Sri Lanka and Burma. This trade has been discontinued. In its place, the Beedi industry became a significant part of the economy. Most women in the area are employed by Beedi Rolling works. Many of the beedi manufacturers in South India laid their production units in and around Melapalayam. Recently, more local men have been working abroad in other Indian states.

Transport
Due to the closed layout of the neighborhood, roads cannot be extended to accommodate buses. Buses going towards Melacheval, Pathamadai, Cheranmahadevi, and Ambasamudhiram pass through the area. There is no bus facility available within the area. Auto sharing used to be used for local transport. However, due to the rash driving of the auto drivers, the business was closed and people are now using taxis for local transportation.

There are currently bus services from Melapalayam to Tirunelveli Town and limited bus services to Palayamkottai, a main education center of Tirunelveli district and Taluk headquarters of Melapalayam. Due to this, students from Melapalayam struggle to take buses in rush hours.

Marriage
The area has its own marriage traditions. Residents would often marry within the city and marriages would generally be held at the local mosque. Before marriage, participants must obtain an NOC (No Objection Certificate) from a mosque or jamath. The marriage feast is also famous for the unique "Thaalcha", known locally as "Kathirikkaanam" (main ingredient is Brinjal) made with Ghee rice and Biriyani.

Food culture
Melapalayam is famous for non-vegetarian food. Special food caterers are available in the city. The food and beverages culture here resembles those of Muslim communities in Kerala and Kayalpattinam. Typical foods include Oottu Mavu, Thakkadi, Medical Rice and Vattlappam . Oottu mavu is a type of snack made with powdered rice deep fried with sugar and eggs. Thakkadi (modified version of Haleem, another typical food) is made with powdered rice, which is made into solid pieces which are soaked in hot masala and eaten with mutton or beef. Medical Rice, popularly known as 'Marunthu Choru (மருந்துச் சோறு) is made with some sidhdha medical ingredients prepared for pregnant people and is eaten during festive occasions. Vattlappam is unique to towns like Melapalayam, Muthupet and some other major Muslim towns in Tamil Nadu. The Vattlappam or Egg pudding (as a combination for Idiyappam or dosa) is made up of eggs, sugar and coconut extracts. This special food is prepared for festivals like Ramzan, Bakrid and marriages.

Hospitals
To serve a densely populated city, hospitals were founded during the 21st century.
1. Government Hospital 
2. Urban PHC
3. Selvan Hospital (a private institute with more than 35 years of experience)
4. Jeyakumar Hospital 
5. Crescent Hospital (established by TNT Jamaath)
and other numerous clinics also available

Health Issues
There is little education on hygiene and, as a result, there is a heightened level of illness in the city. A specific incident involved water contamination caused by improper disposal of beedi waste. A virus was quickly spread through the city.

Social organizations spread awareness on cleanliness and related topics.

Market
Melapalayam is famous for its cattle market, which is said to be the second largest cattle market (மாட்டு சந்தை) in Tamil Nadu next to Devakottai. The market is open only on Tuesdays. Goat and dried fish markets are available in the same place. Merchants from various parts of the state will accumulate at the market on Monday night to begin trading right from midnight. A government administered butchering center also established in this cattle market (மாட்டு சந்தை).

Besides the cattle market, fish and vegetable markets are also available in Melapalayam Bazaar.(உழவர் சந்தை) Uzhavar Santhai (Direct Selling Point of Farmers) is located opposite to Melapalayam Municipal Office.

Banks
 Canara Bank
 Bank of Baroda
 Union Bank of India
 Indian Overseas Bank
 Melapalayam Primary Agricultural Co-operative Bank
 Pandiyan Grama Bank
 Thiruvalluvar Cooperative Bank
 CSB BANK

Social Reforms
Many awareness societies are being formed for the welfare of the people of Melapalayam. Education is the primary social movement.

List of Social Forums
 Minorities Education and Enlightenment Forum (MEEF)
 Melapalayam Health and Education Trust (MHET)
 Social Awareness Service Organisation (SASO)
 Melapalayam Progressive Forum (MPMPROF)
 Speed Blood Service (SBS)
 Melapalayam Healthcare Society (MHS)
 Melapalayam Medical Society (MMS)
 Asura Trust (AT)
Popular Front of India (PFI)
Melapalayam Neer Nilaiya paathukappu & paramarippu sankam (licensed since Aug 19, 2019)
IMFRAS BAITHUL MAAL (IBM) 
Vuharavi welfare association(VWA)
Pasiyilla Melapalayam
Pasumai Melapalayam
QMS-BAITHULMAL (Quide Millath StreetT)
Ibadhur Rahman (Sappani Alim Street)
 SPREAD LOVE

Police station

Melapalayam police station is one of the most active among Tirunelveli city police stations due to its higher rate of religious issues.

Entertainment

Sports
There is no Government organized sports club in the city. Minority welfare organisations have started a games association with games like cricket, kabadi, carrom, volleyball, badminton and football. At the present, there is no dedicated ground  for any games.

Theater
There is one theater in the city, "Alangar Cinemas". It was a famous theater in the 80's and 90's. It has been remodified and opened

Politics
Melapalayam is a part of Palayamkottai Legislative Assembly Constituency.

Apart from state level parties Like ADMK, DMK, DMDK, MDMK, and MJK, Muslim political organizations like TMMK, MMK, SDPI and the Muslim League have strong political holds in Melapalayam.

References

External links
 http://melapalayam-info.blogspot.in/
 http://www.melapalayam.co.in
 https://web.archive.org/web/20120426021756/http://www.mydeen.yolasite.com/melapalayam.php
 http://mpmprof.blogspot.com/
 http://wikimapia.org/556294/Melapalayam
 http://distancebetween.info/tirunelveli/melapalayam
http://timesofindia.indiatimes.com/india/Most-Indians-fighting-for-IS-based-in-Raqqa-says-IS-groupss-Subahani-Haja-Moideen/articleshow/55255416.cms
 https://web.archive.org/web/20120426021741/http://southindianstates.com/tamilnadu_districts/tirunelveli/tirunelveli-schools.html
 http://mpmcareers.blogspot.com/

Villages in Tirunelveli district